Death and Fire, known in German as Tod und Feuer, is a 1940 expressionist painting by Paul Klee.

Death
It was one of the last before his death on June 29th of that year. In 1935 Klee started to suffer from scleroderma, which manifested itself with fatigue, skin rashes, difficulty in swallowing, shortness of breath and pain in the joints of his hands. Paintings during this period tended to be simpler and representative of the suffering he was going through. "Tod", the German word for death, is a common motif throughout the painting. It can be seen most distinctly in the features of the face, though the "d" and "t" are rotated. The word can also be seen in the figure's raised arm as the "T", the yellow orb as the "O", and the figure's head (or torso) as the "D".

Hieroglyphics
The painting also represents hieroglyphics, an interest of Klee's during this time, which can also be seen in many of his other late 1930s paintings, such as Insula dulcamara (1938) and Heroische Rosen (1938). , it is on display at Zentrum Paul Klee, a museum in Bern, Switzerland that is dedicated to the works of Paul Klee.

See also
List of works by Paul Klee

References

External links

1940 paintings
Paintings of Zentrum Paul Klee
Paintings by Paul Klee
Paintings about death